The 2014 AAMI Classic took place between 8–11 January 2014, at the Kooyong Stadium in Melbourne, Australia.

Lleyton Hewitt was going to play, but was replaced by Jordan Thompson after winning the 2014 Brisbane International. In the final it was Kei Nishikori who defeated Tomáš Berdych in the final 7-5 6–4 to become the first Japanese winner of the event.

Seeds

Draw

Main draw

Play-offs

References

 Main Draw

External links
Official AAMI Classic website

Kooyong Classic
AAMI Classic